Tag Team Match: M.U.S.C.L.E., known in Japan as  is a fighting game developed by Tose and published by Bandai for the Nintendo Entertainment System. The Japanese edition is based on Yudetamago's manga and anime series Kinnikuman, but the North American edition was not due to the source material being not well-known outside Japan.

It has eight playable characters, each with his own special move. The game was followed by a 1987 Japan-only sequel for the Famicom Disk System titled .

Gameplay
The game has two modes, one requiring the player to defeat a computer opponent while the other requires two players to fight against each other.

The A button jumps, and B punches or activates a special move after collecting an energy ball that is randomly thrown by the boy called "Meat".

Moves that can be done, punch, jump, drop kick, shove, shove into ropes, flying body attack (jump into ropes and rebound), lariat aka clothes line, shove enemy into ropes and then hit A, back drop aka suplex (press B close behind the enemy).

Although the game goes on endlessly, it officially has 255 rounds, after those rounds, the player enter round 0 (completing the 8 bit variable for rounds number), on which the speed level resets and the time per round returns to 30:00 (from round 100 reduced to 10:00).

It is believed that the maximum score one could get from this game is 99,999,999 points, but it is unknown what will happen afterwards, but it will probably return to 0 as well.

Characters
Kinnikuman (North American version – Muscleman)
Finisher: Kinniku Driver, carries opponent and jumps off screen straight up and comes down. One of the if not the most damage inducing moves in the game.  
Terryman
Finisher: Calf Branding, basically a speedy version of the lariat move in the game without having to rebound off the ropes and can be done repeatedly.
Ramenman
Finisher: Leg Lariat, basically a faster longer version of the regular drop kick move.
Robin Mask
Finisher: Tower Bridge, Argentine back breaker.
Buffaloman (North American version – Terri-bull)
Finisher: Hurricane Mixer, for a short distance he can burst charge with his horned head.
Warsman
Finisher: Bear Claw, covers longer distance than the hurricane mixer
Ashuraman
Finisher: Ashura Buster
Brocken Jr. (Japanese version only)
Finisher: Nazi Gas Attack 
Geronimo (North American version only)
Finisher: Apache War Cry

Note that Brocken Jr. and Geronimo are the same in this game, just slightly different graphics.

Release
The game was released in Japan on November 8, 1985. It was released in North America on October 1986.

The Gold Edition of the Japanese version of the game has been a sought-after collector's item, and is considered the "Holy Grail" of the Famicom collection. In 2017, the Gold Edition of the Famicom version has been valued at ¥2,000,000 ($18,200 USD).

Reception
The game sold  units in Japan.

See also

Kinnikuman

Notes

References

Kinnikuman games
1985 video games
Nintendo Entertainment System games
Nintendo Entertainment System-only games
Bandai games
Action video games
Tag team videogames
Tose (company) games
Multiplayer and single-player video games
Video games developed in Japan